The Stampede Women's Pacific Championship is the major title for female wrestlers in the Canadian professional wrestling promotion Stampede Wrestling.

As it was a professional wrestling championship, the championship was not won not by actual competition, but by a scripted ending to a match determined by the bookers and match makers. On occasion the promotion declares a championship vacant, which means there is no champion at that point in time. This can either be due to a storyline, or real life issues such as a champion suffering an injury being unable to defend the championship, or leaving the company.

Title history

Footnotes

References

Women's Pacific
Women's professional wrestling championships
Regional professional wrestling championships